James Ball (born 24 June 1991) is a Welsh Paralympic cyclist who competes in tandem races as an athlete with a visual impairment. A multiple world champion across the tandem sprint events, Ball's latest title came in 2021, further cementing his partnership alongside Lewis Stewart where they won silver in the 2020 Tokyo Paralympics.

Cycling career

Welshman Ball started his sporting career as a swimmer, before moving to athletics. The visually-impaired athlete was in-line to earn selection in track and field for ParalympicsGB at London 2012, however suffered an injury which ended those aspirations.

On his journey back to full fitness, Ball took part in turbo testing arranged by British Cycling, and his potential on a bike was discovered.

Paired with pilot Craig McLean, Ball took a bronze medal away from his first world championships, in 2016. Paralympic selection – and fifth place in the kilo – followed, before a golden 2017 saw Ball and Matt Rotherham win a sprint double at the world championships in Los Angeles.

Further medals were gained – at both the world championships and the Commonwealth Games – in 2018 where he won Wales's first medal, a silver in the men's B&VI 1,000m time trial.

Ball returned to the top step of the podium at the 2019 world championships, winning the kilo alongside Pete Mitchell.

In 2020 Ball teamed up with Stewart, and the partnership got off to a hugely promising start, winning sprint gold and kilo silver at the world championships in Milton.

In 2021 Ball expanded his collection landing the silver in the men's 1000m time trial at the Tokyo games, further cementing his partnership with Lewis Stewart where they narrowly missed out on the gold to fellow GB teammates Neil Fachie and Matt Rotherham.

Personal history
Ball was born in 1991, and comes from Ponthir in Wales.

References

1991 births
Living people
Welsh male cyclists
Welsh track cyclists
Sportspeople from Torfaen
Cyclists at the 2016 Summer Paralympics
Commonwealth Games medallists in cycling
Commonwealth Games silver medallists for Wales
Cyclists at the 2018 Commonwealth Games
Cyclists at the 2020 Summer Paralympics
Medallists at the 2018 Commonwealth Games